Tuiaualuma "Tui" Alailefaleula (born November 5, 1982) is a former American football defensive tackle in the NFL. He played college football for the Washington Huskies, where he played on the offensive line, and was signed as an undrafted free agent out of the University of Washington, by the New York Giants. Injured in the 2006–2007 NFL season Tui was later cut by the Giants then signed by the New York Jets. Later released on waivers, Tui now works as a youth counselor at the McLaughlin Youth Center in Anchorage, Alaska and is an assistant football coach and offensive line coach at Bartlett High School, where he went to high school.  He also plays offensive tackle for the Alaska Wild of the Indoor Football League.

References

External links
 Washington Huskies bio

1982 births
American football defensive tackles
American sportspeople of Samoan descent
Green Bay Packers players
Living people
New York Jets players
Players of American football from Anchorage, Alaska
Washington Huskies football players
High school football coaches in Alaska